The Spatula was a ski manufactured by Volant skis from 2001 to 2003.  It was the first production ski to feature reverse camber as well as reverse side cut.  The ski was initially envisioned by professional freeskier Shane McConkey as early as 1996, and he convinced the company to manufacture the first prototypes in the summer of 2001.    The Spatula gained a cult following, and along with its successor the K2 Pontoon (2006), inspired other ski manufacturers to experiment with a variety of camber shapes.

Early History

McConkey was an early proponent of so-called "fat" skis, adopting the Volant Chubb, manufactured by his sponsor and with a 90 mm waist, as his every day ski in the 1995-1996 season. That same year, McConkey came up with the concept for the Spatula at a bar in Argentina and sketched the first design onto a beer napkin, believing that a "fat" ski with reverse side-cut would provide additional floatation underfoot where the skier needed it the most.  He eventually deemed this the "pool cover" phenomenon since taking a ski into powder was like running across a pool cover, where the skier's weight sinks the ski while the surrounding snow tries to float it.  His friends mostly thought the concept was crazy, but McConkey retained the napkin and stored in a file.

Approximately two years later in 1998, Volant engineer Peter Turner was skiing with McConkey and several others such as Matchstick Productions filmmaker Scott Gaffney with some prototype Volants that were variations of what was to become McConkey's signature ski, the Volant Machete McH "Huckster," which is itself similar to the earlier Chubb.  These skis were generally variations of a "fat" shaped ski.  Eventually the group realized that some de-cambered Chubbs that were bent upward at the tips and tails skied better in the fresh powder than any of the new prototypes did.  McConkey credited Gaffney as saying, "I think my old, dead, decambered Chubbs float much better in the powder than those ones with new ski life or camber."  Gaffney's assertion prompted McConkey to locate his bar napkin from 1996, and ponder the concept again considering that powder is similar to water.  Since water skis and surf boards have reverse side cut and reverse camber (a/k/a rocker), McConkey was more assured that a dedicated powder ski should have a similar shape.  

McConkey spent the next two years talking to people about his reverse side cut and reverse camber ski, but most people rejected the notion outright except for Gaffney, fellow professional skier JT Holmes, and a few others.

Concept Skis

In 2000, McConkey finally started talking to the designers at Volant about his reverse/reverse concept, bringing Turner his notes that included a page of surfboard reviews.  Turner and fellow Volant engineer Ryan Carroll were the only people interested in pursing this concept with McConkey amidst a company financial crisis, so in the summer of 2001 they hand-built four pairs of concept Spatula skis in their spare time at the original Volant factory in Wheat Ridge, CO.  The prototypes were much lighter than the production skis.  These concept Spatulas featured the full stainless steel cap that Volant was known for, with the stainless steel extending down the sidewalls to the ski's edge.  The prototype is reported to measure, in width, 125 at the tip, 130 at the waist, and 120 at the tail, which is slightly wider than the production ski.

McConkey took possession of the first prototype in August of 2001 and flew to New Zealand with them for a film project.  While other professional skiers flailed in the wet heavy snow, McConkey reported enthusiastically back to Turner how well the ski performed.  Turner filed a provisional patent for the Spatula under his, Carroll's, and McConkey's names.

Volant Closure and Acquisition by Atomic

By the time McConkey returned from New Zealand, stocks buoyed by the tech industry had fallen in what became known as the "dot-com bubble burst," and Volant's chief funder, Mike Markkula, who had been an executive for Apple Computer, decided to close the factory by the end of August.  Volant's intellectual property was acquired by Gen-X Sports, a Canadian company, the following month.  Gen-X Sports had previously purchased Volant's "Limited Snowboards" line in 1999.  Gen-X Sports contracted Volant production with Atomic, which continued the Volant brand at its Austrian manufacturing facility.  

McConkey kept three pairs of the prototype "V1" Spatulas, Carroll kept a single ski, and the other single ski went on tour with Volant to potentially promote the Spatula concept. 

In September of 2002, Huffy Corporation acquired Gen-X Sports, and with it Volant's intellectual property. 

McConkey and Turner convinced Gen-X/Huffy to invest in an initial production run of the "V2" Spatula, which eliminated the full stainless steel cap in favor of an aluminum/fiberglass sidewall with a stainless steel top sheet.  The "V2" sidewall became a feature of all subsequent Atomic-produced Volants.  Atomic insisted on adding lots of fiberglass which weighed the ski down, not understanding how steel worked in the original Volant skis that negated the need for structural fiberglass layers.  The production ski was also stiffer in the tail than the prototypes to balance it and prevent excessive "wheelie" behavior of an overbending tail.  The first batch of 300 skis was produced in October of 2002 for the 2002-2003 ski season.  Marketing literature from 2002 show photos of the "V1" prototype Spatula featuring an image of a spatula rather than the production ski.

According to Ivor Allsop, a ski industry sales rep, the initial 300 ski production run may have simply been the initial delivery as the minimum quantity for any major European ski manufacturer was 1000 skis.  The next portion of the production was likely 700 skis, although many of those may not have been delivered to North America.  In the spring of 2003, Allsop purchased the remaining 530 pairs from Atomic after having sold 60 pairs from Gen-X sports.  Allsop, a resident of Utah, had two pallets of Spatulas in his garage and would ship McConkey 20 pairs at a time for McConkey to sell at cost.  Allsop distributed through Dave Steiner at what is now Palisades Tahoe, and Andy Gardner at Alta.  The rest of the Spatulas he sold on eBay, taking approximately 18 months to liquidate them all due to the relative unpopularity.

The Spatula appeared in its final form in marketing literature in 2003 for the 2003-2004 season.  That literature only advertises a 186 cm Spatula.  However, Volant did produce a few 172 cm Spatulas for the 2003 trade shows that were intended for smaller skiers and for women.  These skis do not appear in any advertising, but occasionally appear in the marketplace.

Amer Group Plc., which owns Atomic, purchased Volant in December of 2003 from Huffy Corporation, granting Atomic all of Volant's patents, trademarks, and intellectual property.  In particular this included the patents for using steel technology in Volant skis.

Post-Volant

Atomic decided to change the marketing strategy for Volant and ended Volant's relationship with Shane McConkey, turning it into a limited-production fashion ski brand marketed in Europe. Accordingly, McConkey's entire line of Volant Machete skis, which included the Spatula, was terminated.  Volant shifted from a performance market to a marketing strategy based upon quality and luxury.  McConkey wanted to build the next generation of the Spatula when he lost Volant's support and moved to K2, where he ultimately designed the K2 Pontoon to avoid future patent infringement.  In private conversations, McConkey confided in Turner that the Pontoon was not nearly as good as the Spatula.  Although Atomic maintained Volant's existing intellectual property rights for stainless steel skis, it did not pursue the patent for the Spatula itself.

Peter Turner went on to co-found the ski company Drake PowderworkS, better known as DPS, and discussed ways of improving on the Spatula design with McConkey, including by adding a small amount of side cut underfoot to give the ski controllability in hard snow or in risky conditions such as a ridge line traverse or the top of a snow chute.  Turner designed these attributes into the DPS Lotus 138.  McConkey told Turner that DPS did a good job with that design.

Rarity and Value

With only 1000 Spatula pairs produced, the ski is relatively rare.  Additionally, it did not sell well to the public who was skeptical about a ski that was intended only for deep powder, and numerous professional ski reviewers reflected this animosity.  Many Spatulas were sold at season-end discounts.  However, the ski eventually caught on and sparked a revolution in the ski industry, which incorporated greater width and rocker that is seen on skis throughout North American ski resorts and backcountry ski enthusiasts since the mid-2000s.  With McConkey's tragic death in 2009, the Spatula's popularity has only increased.  An eBay listing for a new pair of Spatulas in their factory wrapper purportedly sold for the $3,200 asking price in 2018.

References

1.  https://web.archive.org/web/20101009110408/http://www.fuzeqna.com/evogear/consumer/kbdetail.asp?kbid=61

https://shanemcconkey.org/about-shane/

https://www.evo.com/what-is-so-special-about-the-volant-spatula-powder-ski-how-do-i-ski-the-spatulas

https://www.powder.com/stories/classics/the-catalyst/

https://www.skimag.com/uncategorized/air-apparent/

https://matchstickpro.com/focused/

https://blisterreview.com/blister-shops/larrys-bootfitting
https://external-preview.redd.it/h1ob1kECoQe8XbHDas7XEgiS_q96aFxVX1TVIhFdiQM.jpg?auto=webp&v=enabled&s=778251ffb10e867bb6bb385b072b8b09c90c1267

https://www.skimag.com/gear/volant-closes-colorado-plant/

http://www.sginews.com/EMS_Base/EMS_Excerpt.aspx?tTargetUrl=/Content/VOLANT-SPORTS-SHUTTERS-US-7638.aspx

https://www.deseret.com/2001/8/29/19603989/volant-shuts-plant-lays-off-95

https://blisterreview.com/gear-reviews/volant-spatula-2002-2003

https://unofficialnetworks.con/2018/11/08/for-sale-new-volant-spatula-skis/

https://skiracing.com/atomic-purchases-volant-ski-brand-troubled-huffy-corporation/

http://www.sginews.com/EMS_Base/EMS_Excerpt.aspx?tTargetUrl=/Content/GEN-X-SPORTS-ACQUIRES-VOLANT-7697.aspx

https://www.skipass.com/forums/sports/ski/sujet-24699.html

http://www.sginews.com/EMS_Base/EMS_Excerpt.aspx?tTargetUrl=/Content/GEN-X-EQUIPMENT-acquires-4821.aspx

https://mergr.com/huffy-corp---volant-ski-brand-acquired-by-amer-sports

https://sgbonline.com/amers-atomic-division-acquires-volant/

https://skiracing.com/atomic-purchases-volant-ski-brand-troubled-huffy-corporation/

https://www.amersports.com/brand/atomic/

https://www.volantski.com/en

https://unofficialnetworks.con/2018/11/08/for-sale-new-volant-spatula-skis/

Skiing equipment